Seyidlər (until April 1, 2008 in Seyidoba) is a village and municipality in the Saatly Rayon of Azerbaijan. It has a population of 1,077.

References
 

Populated places in Saatly District